Hard Rock FC is a Grenadian football team from Sauteurs that plays in the Grenada Premier Division. They have won the league championship on three occasions.

Honours
 Grenada Premier Division:
 Champions (4): 2011, 2012, 2013, 2016
 Waggy T Super Knockout Tournament:
 Champions (1): 2013
 Runners-up (1): 2012

References

External links
Club Profile

Football clubs in Grenada